is a city in Kyoto Prefecture, Japan. , the city had an estimated population of 78,644 in 34817 households and a population density of 230 persons per km².

Geography
Maizuru is located in northern Kyoto Prefecture, facing scenic Maizuru Bay on the Sea of Japan to the north and Fukui Prefecture to the east.

Neighboring municipalities
Kyoto Prefecture
 Ayabe
Miyazu
Fukuchiyama
Fukui Prefecture
Takahama

Climate
Like Toyooka in Hyōgo Prefecture, Maizuru has a climate resembling the Hokuriku region rather than the rest of Kansai, though it is less wet than other Hokuriku towns during the late autumn and winter because its location on a deep inlet means the northerly winds driven by the Siberian High and Aleutian Low do not produce as much rain and/or snow.

Demographics
Per Japanese census data, the population of Maizuru has declined gradually over the past 30 years.

History 
The area of Maizuru has been inhabited since prehistoric times, and numerous traces of Jomon and Yayoi period settlements have been discovered by archaeologists. The Yura River valley in particular was densely populated, and many kofun burial mounds have been found. The area became part of Tango Province in the Nara period. During the Muromachi period, the Isshiki clan ruled as shugo of the province, but were replaced in the Sengoku period Hosokawa clan, who constructed Tanabe Castle, whose nickname "Maizuru Castle" was later adopted as the name of the city. Following the Following the Battle of Sekigahara, Tokugawa Ieyasu awarded the entire province of Tango to Kyōgoku Takatomo, who established Miyazu Domain. To ensure the succession of his line, Kyōgoku Takatomo gave 35,000 koku of his holdings to his third son, Kyōgoku Takamitsu, and established a cadet branch of the clan at Tango-Tanabe Domain, based at Maizuru Castle. The Kyōgoku were replaced b a cadet branch of the Makino clan,who ruled until the Meiji restoration in 1871. The town of Maizuru was established with the creation of the modern municipalities system on April 1, 1889. The same year, the Maizuru Naval District was created and the associated Maizuru Naval Arsenal for ship basing, construction, and repair was created in 1901. In the Russo-Japanese War, many warships were based there, due to its proximity to the Sea of Japan. Maizuru was raised to city status on August 1, 1938.

After the Second World War, Maizuru was a key port for returning Japanese servicemen and detainees from continental Asia for over 13 years. Today, JMSDF Maizuru Naval Base is a key district headquarters for the Japan Maritime Self-Defense Force.

Government
Maizuru has a mayor-council form of government with a directly elected mayor and a unicameral city council of 26 members. Maizuru contributes two members to the Kyoto Prefectural Assembly. In terms of national politics, the city is part of Kyoto 5th district of the lower house of the Diet of Japan.

Economy
Maizuru has a mixed economy, with commerce, agriculture, forestry, tourism and commercial fishing all playing major roles. Industry, centered on wood processing and shipbuilding, have declined severely due to overseas competition, but Japan Marine United, a large shipbuilding corporation, has one of its main shipyards in Maizuru.

Education

Colleges and universities
 National Institute of Technology, Maizuru campus
 Kyoto University - Maizuru Fisheries Research Station 
 Japan Coast Guard School

Primary and secondary education
Maizuru has 20 public elementary schools and seven public middle schools operated by the town government and two public high schools operated by the Kyoto Prefectural Department of Education. There is also one private high school.

The community previously had a North Korean school, Maizuru Korean Elementary and Junior High School (舞鶴朝鮮初中級学校).

Transportation

Railways
 JR West – Maizuru Line
  -  - 
 JR West – Obama Line
  - 
 Kyoto Tango Railway – Miyazu Line
   -  -  -

Highways
 Maizuru-Wakasa Expressway
 Kyoto Jūkan Expressway

International town twinnings and exchange partnership
 - Nakhodka, Primorsky Krai,  Russia in June 1961, the first Russian - Japanese sister towns in history.
 - Dalian, Liaoning, China since 1982
 - Portsmouth, Hampshire, England since 1998.
 - Rishtan, Fergana region, Uzbekistan since 2019.

Local attractions 
Maizuru is dotted with sightseeing spots. There is Maizuru Repatriation Memorial Museum, a commemorative hall which documents the return of half a million servicemen and detainees from Soviet internment, and an observatory which overlooks the Rias seashore of the Maizuru Bay.

Notable people from Maizuru
 Arisa Inoue, Japanese volleyball player (Hisamitsu Springs and Japan women's national volleyball team)
 Tatsuya Ishihara, Japanese television and film director (Kyoto Animation) 
 Hatsuho Matsuzawa, Japanese swimmer
 Kengo Mashimo, Japanese professional wrestler (Kaientai Dojo)
 Mamoru Nagano, Japanese manga artist, animator, and mecha and character designer
 Mai Ohara, Japanese politician who served in the House of Representatives of Japan
 Jin Ueda, Japanese table tennis player
 Yuki Yamaguchi, former Japanese sprinter who specialised in the 400 metres

References

External links

 Maizuru City — official website  – some English can be accessed.
 Maizuru Repatriation Memorial Museum — official website 

Cities in Kyoto Prefecture
Port settlements in Japan
Populated coastal places in Japan
Maizuru